Junak may refer to:

SFM Junak, a brand of Polish motorcycle (1956–1965)
Almot Junak, a brand of Polish motorcycle (2010-)
Junák, Czech (and Czechoslovak) Scouting organization 
LWD Junak, Polish trainer aircraft (1952–1972)
PWS-40 Junak, Polish trainer aircraft (1939)
Zlín 22  Junák, Czechoslovak trainer aircraft (1947)
Fiat 508 Junak, version of Fiat 508 produced in Poland (1935–1939)
A number of soccer teams, including:
NK Junak Sinj
Junak Drohobycz

See also
Yunak (disambiguation)